Molecular graphics is the discipline and philosophy of studying molecules and their properties through graphical representation. IUPAC limits the definition to representations on a "graphical display device". Ever since Dalton's atoms and Kekulé's benzene, there has been a rich history of hand-drawn atoms and molecules, and these representations have had an important influence on modern molecular graphics.

Colour molecular graphics are often used on chemistry journal covers artistically.

History

Prior to the use of computer graphics in representing molecular structure, Robert Corey and Linus Pauling developed a system for representing atoms or groups of atoms from hard wood on a scale of 1 inch = 1 angstrom connected by a clamping device to maintain the molecular configuration. These early models also established the CPK coloring scheme that is still used today to differentiate the different types of atoms in molecular models (e.g. carbon = black, oxygen = red, nitrogen = blue, etc). This early model was improved upon in 1966 by W.L. Koltun and are now known as Corey-Pauling-Koltun (CPK) models.

The earliest efforts to produce models of molecular structure was done by Project MAC using wire-frame models displayed on a cathode ray tube in the mid 1960s. In 1965, Carroll Johnson distributed the Oak Ridge thermal ellipsoid plot (ORTEP) that visualized molecules as a ball-and-stick model with lines representing the bonds between atoms and ellipsoids to represent the probability of thermal motion. Thermal ellipsoid plots quickly became the de facto standard used in the display of X-ray crystallography data, and are still in wide use today. The first practical use of molecular graphics was a simple display of the protein myoglobin using a wireframe representation in 1966 by Cyrus Levinthal and Robert Langridge working at Project MAC.

Among the milestones in high-performance molecular graphics was the work of Nelson Max in "realistic" rendering of macromolecules using reflecting spheres.

Initially much of the technology concentrated on high-performance 3D graphics. During the 1970s, methods for displaying 3D graphics using cathode ray tubes were developed using continuous tone computer graphics in combination with electro-optic shutter viewing devices. The first devices used an active shutter 3D system, generating different perspective views for the left and right channel to provide the illusion of three-dimensional viewing. Stereoscopic viewing glasses were designed using lead lanthanum zirconate titanate (PLZT) ceramics as electronically-controlled shutter elements. Active 3D glasses require batteries and work in concert with the display to actively change the presentation by the lenses to the wearer's eyes. Many modern 3D glasses use a passive, polarized 3D system that enables the wearer to visualize 3D effects based on their own perception. Passive 3D glasses are more common today since they are less expensive.

The requirements of macromolecular crystallography also drove molecular graphics because the traditional techniques of physical model-building could not scale. The first two protein structures solved by molecular graphics without the aid of the Richards' Box were built with Stan Swanson's program FIT on the Vector General graphics display in the laboratory of Edgar Meyer at Texas A&M University: First Marge Legg in Al Cotton's lab at A&M solved a second, higher-resolution structure of staph. nuclease (1975) and then Jim Hogle solved the structure of monoclinic lysozyme in 1976. A full year passed before other graphics systems were used to replace the Richards' Box for modelling into density in 3-D. Alwyn Jones' FRODO program (and later "O") were developed to overlay the molecular electron density determined from X-ray crystallography and the hypothetical molecular structure.

Timeline

Types

Ball-and-stick models

In the ball-and-stick model, atoms are drawn as small sphered connected by rods representing the chemical bonds between them.

Space-filling models

In the space-filling model, atoms are drawn as solid spheres to suggest the space they occupy, in proportion to their van der Waals radii. Atoms that share a bond overlap with each other.

Surfaces

In some models, the surface of the molecule is approximated and shaded to represent a physical property of the molecule, such as electronic charge density.

Ribbon diagrams

Ribbon diagrams are schematic representations of protein structure and are one of the most common methods of protein depiction used today. The ribbon shows the overall path and organization of the protein backbone in 3D, and serves as a visual framework on which to hang details of the full atomic structure, such as the balls for the oxygen atoms bound to the active site of myoglobin in the adjacent image. Ribbon diagrams are generated by interpolating a smooth curve through the polypeptide backbone. α-helices are shown as coiled ribbons or thick tubes, β-strands as arrows, and non-repetitive coils or loops as lines or thin tubes. The direction of the polypeptide chain is shown locally by the arrows, and may be indicated overall by a colour ramp along the length of the ribbon.

See also
 Molecular model
 Molecular modelling
 Molecular geometry
 Molecule editor
 Software
 Molecular graphics software
 Molecular mechanics modeling software
 Molecular design software

References

External links
 Luminary Series Interview with Robert Langridge Interview by Russ Altman and historical slides.
 History of Visualization of Biological Macromolecules by Eric Martz and Eric Francoeur.

Graphics
Visualization (graphics)
Computer graphics